Saraakallio rock paintings are situated in Central Finland. The rock site lies on the eastern shore of Lake Saraavesi, opposite the village center of Laukaa. The rocky cliff of Saraakallio is an impressive landmark rising on the shore of the lake. An important water route Keitele Canal runs in front of the paintings.

There are two art areas, Saraakallio I and Saraakallio II. It is difficult to count and list all the paintings of Saraakallio, partly because they are so many and varied, partly because many of them are blurred, fragmentary or have been painted over. The amount of pictures is between 50–200, and therefore it is the biggest rock art area in Finland. The main examinations of Saraakallio are made by amateur archaeologist Pekka Kivikäs. Oldest paintings are circa 6600 years old. The most common themes in Saraakallio paintings are deer, human, and boat figures. Saraakallio rock paintings are made by using red paint, which is made of hematite-containing soil mixed presumably with blood, urea and eggs.

See also
 Finnish rock art

References

External links 
 Pictures of Saraakallio I 
 Pictures of Saraakallio II (unfinished) 

Archaeology of Finland
Rock art in Europe
rock
Laukaa